Vladimir Viktorovich Titov (born 8 May 1969) is a former Russian professional football player.

Honours
 Russian Third League Zone 6 top scorer: 1995 (12 goals).

External links
 

1969 births
People from Kamensk-Uralsky
Living people
Soviet footballers
Russian footballers
Association football midfielders
FC Ural Yekaterinburg players
Russian Premier League players
Sportspeople from Sverdlovsk Oblast